Harry Wesley Bass Jr. (January 6, 1927 – April 4, 1998), was an American businessman, coin collector, and philanthropist. He was active in the Texas Republican Party during the late 1950s when the state was still dominated by the Democratic Party.

In 1970, Bass and his brother Richard inherited the Goliad Oil and Gas Corporation. Bass invested in ski resorts in Aspen and Vail, Colorado. He was the main developer of the Beaver Creek Resort in Beaver Creek. He also amassed one of the world's great coin collections and served as the president of the American Numismatic Society.

Early life
Bass was born in Oklahoma City, Oklahoma. His father, Harry W. Bass Sr., was a co-founder of the Goliad Corporation and the Goliad Oil and Gas Corporation in Duncanville, near Dallas, Texas. He had a brother, Richard Bass.

Bass was educated at the St. Mark's School of Texas, then known as the Texas Country Day School. He attended Southern Methodist University. During World War II, he served in the South Pacific with the United States Navy.

Career
Bass started his career in Calgary, Alberta, Canada for his father's oil and gas companies.

Bass launched a voter data-collection company and served as the finance chairman of the Republican Party of Dallas County in the late 1950s. The company proved to be a financial failure. He was elected chairman of the Dallas County GOP in 1957, but resigned later that year. By 1960, alongside Republican U.S. Representative Bruce Alger of Texas's 5th congressional district, he staged a demonstration against Democratic U.S. Senator (later President) Lyndon B. Johnson when the latter visited Dallas. He was a delegate to the 1964 Republican National Convention.

Bass co-owned H. W. Bass and Sons, a private company headquartered in Dallas. He also invested in the development of ski resorts in Aspen, Colorado, in 1955. Later, he owned 7 percent of the Aspen Ski Corporation with his brother. He invested in the development of Vail and became majority shareholder of Vail Associates, Inc., with 57 percent in 1978. He served as its chairman by 1979. He expanded his holdings to include Beaver Creek Resort.

Numismatics and philanthropy
Bass began collecting coins in the middle 1960s. He regularly attended coin auctions.

By 1976, he had invested "millions of dollars" in coins. He added that he had 25 per cent of my portfolio in coins," mostly of which were gold coins from the 19th century to 1933. They were held in a trust. He became a member of the American Numismatic Society in 1966. By 1979, he was its president.

Bass founded the Harry W. Bass Jr. Research Foundation in 1991. One of its goals was to support numismatics.

Personal life
Bass married Mary Mathewson in 1947. He later married Doris Wampler Calhoun.

Death and legacy
Bass died on April 4, 1998 in Dallas and is interred at the Sparkman-Hillcrest Memorial Park Cemetery. Shortly after his death, the Harry W. Bass Jr. Research Foundation was merged with his late father's philanthropic foundation, the Harry Bass Foundation, to form the Harry W. Bass Jr. Foundation.

The endowment comes from oil investments as well as the proceeds from auctions of his coin collection. For example, thirty coins from his collection were auctioned in 2014 in Dallas.

References

External links

1927 births
1998 deaths
Businesspeople from Oklahoma City
People from Dallas
People from Aspen, Colorado
People from Eagle County, Colorado
Southern Methodist University alumni
United States Navy personnel of World War II
Businesspeople from Texas
American businesspeople in the oil industry
Philanthropists from Texas
Texas Republicans
Burials at Sparkman-Hillcrest Memorial Park Cemetery
St. Mark's School (Texas) alumni
20th-century American philanthropists
20th-century American businesspeople
 American expatriates in Canada